Okains  Bay is a settlement, beach and bay on the Banks Peninsula in the South Island of New Zealand.

It is 86km (90 minutes drive) from Christchurch. The sandy beach is popular with tourists and has a river estuary emptying into the bay. The settlement itself contains the Okains Bay Maori and Colonial Museum. There is a camp ground on the beach near the estuary. The beach is often deserted and there is a large cave to explore at one end.

Maori settlement 
Okains Bay is known as Kawatea in Maori. It is important to the Ngai Tahu because a rangatira  or chief called Moki established his Pa or settlement here when Ngai Tahu migrated to Canterbury. Okains Bay has been recognized  as the first landing place of Ngai Tahu on Banks Peninsula. Carbon dating of artefacts suggest that Maori were present in Okains bay in the 1300s.

European settlement 
Okains Bay gained its European name from a Captain Hamilton, who, when was sailing past, was reading a book written by Okain (O'Kane), an Irish naturalist. It was first settled by Europeans around 1850.  By September 1850 the first sections of land were sold by the Canterbury Association to the first European settlers. Due to the lack of roads, transport was to and from Lyttelton (21 miles away) by a steamer, which stopped along the way at Little Akaloa. 

The main sawmill began operating in 1874. It is now a shearing shed. Timber was moved by a trolley line to the first wharf which was situated at the centre of the beach. The cheese factory opened in 1894 and closed in 1968.

Three different wharves were built at different times to accommodate boats berthing at Okains Bay. They were used for transporting livestock, meat, wool, timber, grass seed, dairy produce, store provisions and people. The first two wharves became inoperable due to the movement of the sand around them. The third wharf was closed and demolished in 1964 and the timber from it was used to repair road bridges in 1964.

Demographics
Okains Bay is part of the Eastern Bays-Banks Peninsula statistical area.

Eastern Bays-Banks Peninsula had a population of 615 at the 2018 New Zealand census, a decrease of 39 people (-6.0%) since the 2013 census, and an increase of 9 people (1.5%) since the 2006 census. There were 258 households. There were 306 males and 309 females, giving a sex ratio of 0.99 males per female. The median age was 50.7 years (compared with 37.4 years nationally), with 108 people (17.6%) aged under 15 years, 48 (7.8%) aged 15 to 29, 336 (54.6%) aged 30 to 64, and 123 (20.0%) aged 65 or older.

Ethnicities were 95.1% European/Pākehā, 12.2% Māori, 1.5% Pacific peoples, and 1.5% other ethnicities (totals add to more than 100% since people could identify with multiple ethnicities).

The proportion of people born overseas was 19.5%, compared with 27.1% nationally.

Although some people objected to giving their religion, 51.7% had no religion, 37.6% were Christian, 0.5% were Muslim, 0.5% were Buddhist and 3.4% had other religions.

Of those at least 15 years old, 141 (27.8%) people had a bachelor or higher degree, and 60 (11.8%) people had no formal qualifications. The median income was $31,300, compared with $31,800 nationally. The employment status of those at least 15 was that 258 (50.9%) people were employed full-time, 117 (23.1%) were part-time, and 6 (1.2%) were unemployed.

Notable buildings

The Maori and Colonial Museum 

Originally a cheese factory, the museum was developed thanks to the enthusiasm and collection of Murray Thacker, a local resident who spent his childhood collecting Maori taonga from local beaches. The collection includes tiki, fishing equipment, tools, weapons, cloaks and is of national significance.

Tini Arapata marae 

The Tini Arapata marae was named by Aunty Jane Manahi for her mum Tini Arapata Horau.

Okains school 

The original Okains Bay school building. This was built in 1872 and used until 1938.

Petrol station

Okains Bay store and post office 

The store and post office were built in 1873.

Library 

The Library was built in 1865.

St John the Evangelist Anglican church 
The church was completed in June 1863. The total cost was 554 pounds, nine shillings and eight pence. It was built by a Mr. Morey, a stonemason. The stone and timber were all sourced locally and the slate roof and the stained glass were obtained from England. 

In 1884 the organ was purchased from St Barnabas Church in Fendalton. The church bell was donated by the vicar in 1912. IN 1955, 400 pounds was spent repointing the stone work and other repairs. The floor began to crumble in 1959 due to dry rot. A concrete floor was laid. 

The church was in 2020 the second oldest standing stone church in the diocese of Christchurch. It was severely damaged by the 2010 and 2011 Canterbury earthquakes.

References

Bays of Canterbury, New Zealand
Banks Peninsula
Populated places in Canterbury, New Zealand
Beaches of New Zealand
Landforms of Canterbury, New Zealand
Populated coastal places in New Zealand